The Chaplin School of Hospitality & Tourism Management at Florida International University, located at the Biscayne Bay Campus in North Miami, Florida in the United States is one of the University's 26 schools and colleges. The University was chartered in 1965 and opened in 1972.

The campus includes a natural mangrove preserve, direct access to the bay, apartment-style housing, library, aquatic center, and the Roz and Cal Kovens Conference Center. On-campus housing is also available at the Bay Vista Apartments through the housing community.

Admissions 
FIU’s Chaplin School of Hospitality & Tourism Management has been recognized as one of the top hospitality programs in the country, with more than 2,000 undergraduate and graduate students per year.

Undergraduate and graduate applicants are required to submit an application for admission to the University and to follow admission procedures stated on its prospective Admissions website. In order to be approved for entrance into the School, applicants must first be eligible for admission into the University.

The School is accredited by the following : Commission on Colleges of the Southern Association of Colleges and Schools (SACS) and Accreditation Commission for Programs in Hospitality Administration (ACPHA).

Degrees 
The School offers flexible study options with its variety of degrees and certificate programs in Hotel, Restaurant, Hospitality, Travel and Tourism specializations available both on campus and via distance learning.

Undergraduate 
 Bachelor of Science in Hospitality Management
 Combined Bachelor of Science & Master in Science in Hospitality Management (4+1) Program

Graduate 
 Master of Science in Hospitality Management (non-thesis and thesis)
 Executive Master of Science in Hospitality Management
 Joint Master of Science in International Real Estate and Hospitality Management
 Specialization in Hospitality Real Estate Development

Facilities 
The school is located on the Biscayne Bay Campus, which is about 200 acres (809,000 m2).

The government of the People’s Republic of China selected Florida International University from a group of hospitality schools in the U.S. and Europe as its partner in establishing a hospitality and tourism management campus in Tianjin, the third largest city in China which serves as the seaport for the capital, Beijing. The center has a total capacity for 2,000 students. The FIU Marriott Tianjin China Program opened in September 2006.

Gallery

References

External links 
 

Florida International University
Hospitality schools in the United States